Watson Comly School, also known as Somerton Masonic Hall, is a historic school building located in the Somerton neighborhood of Philadelphia, Pennsylvania.

Built in 1892–1893, it is a two-story, four-bay, brownstone building in the Colonial Revival style. It features a one-story stone entrance pavilion and large hipped roof with stone chimney. The school was named for Watson Comly, a local resident who held many public offices, including serving several terms as a representative in the state legislature.

The building served as a school from its completion until 1928, when it was replaced by a larger building on Byberry Road. The same year, the site was acquired by the Masons, in exchange for the land on which the new school was built. The Masons used it for many years from 1930 as a lodge hall.

The site was added to the National Register of Historic Places in 1988.

References

School buildings on the National Register of Historic Places in Philadelphia
Colonial Revival architecture in Pennsylvania
School buildings completed in 1893
Northeast Philadelphia
Former Masonic buildings in the United States
Defunct schools in Pennsylvania